Peter Arthur (born 4 April 1939) is a British weightlifter. He competed at the 1968 Summer Olympics and the 1972 Summer Olympics.

References

External links
 

1939 births
Living people
British male weightlifters
Olympic weightlifters of Great Britain
Weightlifters at the 1968 Summer Olympics
Weightlifters at the 1972 Summer Olympics
Sportspeople from Swansea
Commonwealth Games medallists in weightlifting
Commonwealth Games bronze medallists for Wales
Weightlifters at the 1962 British Empire and Commonwealth Games
Weightlifters at the 1970 British Commonwealth Games
20th-century British people
Medallists at the 1962 British Empire and Commonwealth Games
Medallists at the 1970 British Commonwealth Games